Le Râteau is a mountain in the French Alps.

The mountain overlooks the valley of the Romanche river and the village of La Grave to the north.  The summit is very close to Meije, which is separated by a ridge.

Le Râteau has the appearance of a rake or a comb with several teeth; the English translation of le râteau is "the rake".  The mountain has two distinct peaks at its ends.

References 

Alpine three-thousanders
Mountains of Hautes-Alpes
Mountains of the Alps